Shavei, a Hebrew word meaning returnee, may refer to:

Places
Shavei Shomron
Shavei Tzion

Other uses
Shavei Israel